James Caldwell (born January 16, 1955) is an American football coach who is a senior assistant for the Carolina Panthers of the National Football League (NFL). He served as the head coach of the Indianapolis Colts from 2009 to 2011 and Detroit Lions from 2014 to 2017. Caldwell has been a part of two Super Bowl-winning teams in his career; as the assistant head coach and quarterbacks coach of the Colts team that won Super Bowl XLI and as offensive coordinator of the Baltimore Ravens team that won Super Bowl XLVII.

College career
Caldwell attended the University of Iowa, where he was a four-year starter at defensive back for the Iowa Hawkeyes football team from 1973 to 1976.

Coaching career

College
Caldwell served as an assistant coach at the University of Iowa, Southern Illinois University, Northwestern University, University of Colorado at Boulder, University of Louisville, and Pennsylvania State University before being named head coach at Wake Forest University in 1993.  He was the first African-American head football coach in the Atlantic Coast Conference (ACC). Caldwell was inducted into Omicron Delta Kappa - The National Leadership Honor Society at Wake Forest in 1996.

In eight years, Caldwell had a record of 26–63.  He installed a powerful passing attack that set numerous school records, many of which have since been broken under his successor, Jim Grobe.  However, his teams rarely ran well; in one year the Demon Deacons' leading rusher only notched 300 yards for the entire season.  He only had one winning season, in 1999, when the Deacons won the Aloha Bowl.

Indianapolis Colts
Caldwell joined Tony Dungy's staff with the Tampa Bay Buccaneers in 2001 as quarterbacks coach.  He followed Dungy to Indianapolis in 2002 and remained with him for his entire tenure, helping lead the Colts to a win in Super Bowl XLI.

On January 13, 2008, Caldwell was formally announced as Dungy's successor-in-waiting. On January 12, 2009, Dungy announced his retirement, putting Caldwell in the head coaching position. He was formally introduced at a press conference the following day.

Caldwell had one of the best debut seasons for a head coach in NFL history, finishing with a 14–2 record.  The Colts rushed out to a 14–0 start. With the AFC South title and the top seed in the AFC playoffs secured, Caldwell opted (on orders from then GM, Bill Polian) to sit out his starting players the last two games of the season (both losses), drawing controversy to him and the team.  He later won his first playoff game against the Baltimore Ravens on January 16, 2010. On January 24, 2010, Caldwell became the fifth rookie head coach to lead his team to the Super Bowl after securing a 30–17 win against the New York Jets in the AFC Championship Game. On February 7, 2010, Caldwell's rookie season ended with a 31–17 loss in Super Bowl XLIV to the New Orleans Saints.

Caldwell shares the NFL record for the best start by a rookie head coach, starting his career with 14 wins. George Seifert led the San Francisco 49ers to 14 wins as a rookie head coach in 1989. The 14 wins also tied a Colts franchise record. As of Super Bowl LV, Caldwell is the last rookie head coach to reach the Super Bowl.

In his second season the Colts posted a 10–6 record but maintained the division title in the AFC South. They lost their first game in the playoffs to the New York Jets, 17–16, on January 8, 2011, marking the end of the Peyton Manning era in Indianapolis.

The 2011 season, however, saw the Colts sink to 2–14.  Starting quarterback Peyton Manning missed the entire season due to undergoing neck surgeries, and without him the Colts appeared to be a rudderless team. Caldwell was fired after the season. The league-worst record however, gave the Colts the No. 1 pick in the 2012 NFL Draft, which they would end up using to draft Stanford quarterback Andrew Luck.

Baltimore Ravens
Thirteen days after his dismissal from the Indianapolis Colts, Caldwell was named quarterbacks coach by the Baltimore Ravens on January 30, 2012. On December 10, 2012, the Ravens dismissed Cam Cameron and named Caldwell the offensive coordinator. On the day after defeating the New England Patriots in the AFC championship game, head coach John Harbaugh announced on January 22, 2013, that Caldwell would be the team's permanent offensive coordinator going into the 2013 season. On February 3, 2013, Caldwell helped lead the Ravens to a 34–31 victory over the San Francisco 49ers in Super Bowl XLVII at the Mercedes-Benz Superdome.

Detroit Lions
On January 14, 2014, the Detroit Lions announced Caldwell as their new head coach. He was the first African American to hold the position for the Lions.

In Caldwell's first season with the Lions, they posted an 11–5 record and made the playoffs as a wild card. They were defeated in the first round by the Dallas Cowboys, losing by a score of 24–20.

Halfway through the 2015 season, the Lions had struggled to a 1–7 record, and both team president Tom Lewand and general manager Martin Mayhew were fired. There was speculation that Caldwell would soon be fired as well, but the next week the Lions won a road game against the Green Bay Packers for the first time since 1991. Ultimately, Detroit won 6 of their final 8 games to finish the season with a 7–9 record, and Caldwell retained his job.

In 2016, Caldwell's third season in Detroit, the Lions improved to a 9–7 record and lost to the Packers in a Week 17 game that determined the winner of NFC North. The Lions clinched another wild card berth, but lost in the first round to the Seattle Seahawks, 26–6.

The Lions went 9–7 again in 2017, in a season widely considered a disappointment despite the Lions' winning record. After the Lions missed the playoffs following a mediocre performance in the second half of the season, there was speculation about Caldwell's future, given the team's performance and belief that Lions general manager Bob Quinn, who was hired during Caldwell's second year, may have wanted to bring in a coach from his former team, the New England Patriots. Subsequently, on January 1, 2018, the day after the season ended, Caldwell was fired by the Lions. He was succeeded by Patriots defensive coordinator Matt Patricia the following month. The firing of Caldwell drew retrospective contention due to the team not showing improvement during his tenure, but regressing under Patricia.

Caldwell's record as Lions coach was 36–28 (.563), making him the first non-interim Lions coach to leave the team with a winning record since Joe Schmidt, who led the team from 1967 to 1972. His .563 winning percentage was also the best for a Lions' head coach since Buddy Parker in the 1950s.

XFL
After being released from Detroit at the end of the 2017 NFL season, Caldwell was hired by the reincarnated XFL to a consulting panel that addressed football rules for the league.

Caldwell was interviewed in December 2018 by the Green Bay Packers for their open head coach position that was previously held by Mike McCarthy until being let go mid-season in 2018. Caldwell also interviewed for head coaching vacancies with the New York Jets and the Cleveland Browns.

Miami Dolphins
After the Miami Dolphins hired Brian Flores as their new head coach, Caldwell was hired to Flores' staff as assistant head coach and quarterbacks coach on February 8, 2019. On July 13, 2019, it was announced Caldwell would take a leave of absence to address health issues, but remained as a consultant. Following the 2019 season, Caldwell was not retained by the Dolphins.

On January 4, 2022, Caldwell interviewed to become the next head coach of the Jacksonville Jaguars. On January 15, he completed an interview for the head coaching job at the Chicago Bears. He was later interviewed for a second time by new General Manager Ryan Poles on January 25.

Caldwell not receiving another head coaching opportunity since 2017, along with his dismissals from the Colts and Lions, were cited by Flores as examples of the league's racial discrimination in his 2022 class-action lawsuit against the NFL.

Carolina Panthers
On January 9, 2023, Caldwell was interviewed as a candidate for the Carolina Panthers' head coach position.

On February 14th, 2023, Caldwell was named a senior assistant for the Panthers under new head coach Frank Reich.

Family
Caldwell and his wife, Cheryl, have four children: Jimmy, Jermaine, Jared and Natalie.

Head coaching record

College

NFL

References

External links

 ESPN profile

1955 births
Living people
African-American coaches of American football
African-American players of American football
American football defensive backs
Baltimore Ravens coaches
Carolina Panthers coaches
Colorado Buffaloes football coaches
Detroit Lions head coaches
Indianapolis Colts coaches
Indianapolis Colts head coaches
Iowa Hawkeyes football coaches
Iowa Hawkeyes football players
Louisville Cardinals football coaches
Miami Dolphins coaches
National Football League offensive coordinators
Northwestern Wildcats football coaches
Penn State Nittany Lions football coaches
Players of American football from Wisconsin
Southern Illinois Salukis football coaches
Sportspeople from Beloit, Wisconsin
Tampa Bay Buccaneers coaches
Wake Forest Demon Deacons football coaches
21st-century African-American people
20th-century African-American sportspeople